Tiri (Ciri, Tĩrĩ), or Mea (Ha Mea), is an Oceanic language of New Caledonia.

Grammar

Pronouns and person marking
Tîrî has two types of pronouns: personal pronouns, which make reference to person, number and case, and impersonal pronouns, which only have one respective form and are more restricted in their use (Osumi, 1995, p. 38).

Like all other nominals in Tîrî, pronouns can occupy various positions throughout the clause (Osumi, 1995, p. 37). They may appear as the nominal subject of the verb, marked by the subject marker nrâ and agreeing in person and number with the subject pronoun in the predicate; the object of a verb; the object of a preposition; or the head of a predicate (Osumi, 1995, pp. 37–38).

When they appear within the verb phrase, personal pronouns show agreement in person and number with the nominal subject that optionally follows the predicate (Osumi, 1995, p. 38).

Personal pronouns in Tîrî also mark listener clusivity in the first person non-singular, and are generally used for human referents (Osumi, 1995, p. 39). The below example shows appropriate usage of the third person singular nrâ (not to be confused with the latter nrâ, which is acting as a subject marker for the optional nominal subject toni).

Although the third person pronoun can be used for non-human entities (while the first and second person pronouns generally only refer to humans), speakers tend to use it in its singular form even when there is more than one referent, as seen below (Osumi, 1995, p. 39).

As indicated in the table above, Tîrî pronouns change form depending on whether they are being used as subjective, objective or free forms, the latter encompassing a variety of other pronoun usages, such as pronouns that have been topicalized and occur sentence-initially, as seen below (Osumi, 1995, pp. 39–40).

While they are classified as pronouns as they fill the subject pronoun slot, Tîrî's two impersonal pronouns show less flexibility than personal pronouns. They do not show any distinction for person or number and occur only in their respective forms of hêrrê and va, are unable to appear anywhere other than the subject pronoun position (the first element in the verb phrase), and are never followed by a nominal subject (Osumi, 1995, p. 41).

Speakers use hêrrê to refer to any number of unspecified entities when they do not wish to or are not concerned with specifying a referent as the agent of an action (Osumi, 1995, p. 41), as in the example below.

This contrasts with the below example, which is more likely to be used by a speaker who wishes to imply that a particular person has committed the same act (Osumi, 1995, p. 42).

While hêrrê is typically used to refer to humans, the impersonal pronoun va is used similarly to refer to non-human referents, though this is not always the case (Osumi, 1995, p. 43). Va behaves much as the English pronouns it and that insofar as they can refer to both particular things (e.g. Did it bite you?; What's that over there?) as well as propositions (e.g. It's the truth.; That's a lie.), as demonstrated below (Osumi, 1995, p. 43).

Subject pronouns may be used in conjunction with the tense-aspect markers ei 'future' and a 'perfect, actual, definite', in which case a number of pronouns may change their phonological form (see the below example, in which the second person singular ke has been combined with a) (Osumi, 1995, p. 170).

Possession 
Tîrî, like most Oceanic languages, exhibits many types of possessive constructions, including possessive prepositions, possessive classifiers and bound-form nouns (Osumi, 1995, pp. 144). Classic possessive constructions involve two nominals that indicate the referent of one is possessed by the other. Tîrî has two types of possessive relationships, inalienable possession and alienable possession (Osumi, 1995, pp. 145). Inalienable possession describes an inherent relationship between two referents such as kinship, while alienable possession describes a non-inherent relationship such as temporary ownership or voluntary association (Osumi, 1995, pp. 145).

Alienable possession 
In Tîrî, alienable possession can occur in two ways. The first is when the noun possessed is followed by a possessive preposition and then by a pronominal or nominal processor (Osumi, 1995, pp. 145). The second is when the noun possessed occurs in apposition with a possessive classifier (Osumi, 1995, pp. 145).

Possessive prepositions 
Prepositions are included in a closed set of grammatical words that are placed immediately before a noun phrase and express a syntactic relationship between the noun phrase and a predicate or another noun phrase (Osumi, 1995, pp. 145).

There are three possessive prepositional markers in Tiri: nrâ, rre/rrê, and ò and they occur between two nominals in the following structure.

NP(possessed)       nrâ, rre/rrê, ò          NP(possessor) (Osumi, 1995, p. 145).

nrâ functions as both a subject and possessive marker when it precedes a noun phrase. As a possessive marker, it links the possessor to the preceding noun phrase, suggesting temporary possession (Osumi, 1995, p. 145). In Tîrî, the majority of nouns can occur with nrâ.

The possessive marker variants rre/rrê are restricted to the nouns, mwâ ‘hut’, wâ ‘boat’ and ò ‘pot’ (Osumi, 1995, p. 146).

The possessed noun phrases that can occur with prepositions ò are limited to nre ‘fire, firewood’ or compounds with nre: mee-nre ‘habitation’, pwò-nre ‘touch’, and mwârrâ-nre ‘fire flame’ (Osumi, 1995, p. 147). The possessive relationship expressed by ò is related to fire, with the purpose of warming oneself or cooking something.

In these examples, the possessive prepositions, nrâ, rrê and ò are between two nominals, as in the structure above.

Possessive Classifiers 
Another type of alienability is in constructions where the possessed nouns occur in apposition with a possessive classifier. Possessive classifiers are always either bound to pronominal or nominal possessors and they function to determine the nature of possession rather than to classify it (Osumi, 1995, p. 49). In Tîrî, unlike other languages, any noun can occur with a possessive classifier. They consist of the following: e-, ere-, hwee-, odho-, hwiie-, êê- and hêê- (Osumi, 1995, p. 49).

In Tîrî, the possessive classifier can be placed before or after the noun possessed, as seen below (Osumi, 1995, p. 149).

NP (possessed)        POSS.CLASSIFIER  NP (possessor)

OR,

POSS.CLASSIFIER NP (possessor)                      NP (possessed)

Examples of the possessive classifier in between two NPs:

Examples of the possessive classifier preceding two NPs:

Inalienable possession 
Nouns that occur with inalienable possession are generally ones whose referents have no independent existence but are related to an entity (Osumi, 1995, p. 152). In Tiri, inalienable possession is the juxtaposition of two nouns in the following structure:

NP (possessed) – NP (possessor) (Osumi, 1995, p. 152).

Bound-form nouns 
There are two types of bound-form nouns, bound nouns and link nouns. This class is inalienable as that the referents of the nouns are possessed in some inextricable way, for example, kinship and body parts.  In most cases, the possessor has no control over the possession.

Bound nouns 
Bound nouns are those that either has possessive pronoun suffixes or are bound to a nominal possessor (Osumi, 1995, p. 59). They include nouns referring to kinship, body or plants or other inanimate parts, secretions or of the body or plant, personal attributes or properties and the effects or origins of human affairs (Osumi, 1995, p. 153).

They can also be bound to another root either noun or verb, in compound constructions (Osumi, 1995, p. 59). For example of afiraa  'wife', where it is bound to the third person singular possessive nrî:

An example of the body part mouth with the first person singular rò:

Link nouns 
Link nouns referents belong to similar categories of bound nouns such as kinship and body or plants or other inanimate parts. They are obligatorily linked to a pronoun or head of a pronominal phrase, where the possessive relationship is demonstrated by a link morpheme -nrâ- (Osumi, 1995, p. 62). The construction has this following form:

NP (possessed) – nrâ (link) – NP (possessor) (Osumi, 1995, p. 154).

When the possessor is the first person singular, the link morpheme -nrâ- is often omitted as seen below.

-nrâ-  is also identical in form to the general possessive prepositions. Therefore, link nouns are alike to free common nouns that are followed by the possessive nrâ. Both constructions are difficult to differentiate, the link nouns depict inalienable possession and cannot be separated from their possessor by an element (Osumi, 1995, p. 154).

This subclass of nouns includes some from the words in the following list.

There can also be morphological complex link nouns, which involve a bound noun or a location noun in the first position, with the link noun in the second (Osumi, 1995, p. 64).

Although the examples represented are not comprehensive for both bound and link nouns, they show that there is no structural distinction between the two subclasses. Analysis of a Tîrî corpus by Midori Osumi (1995, p. 65) found that there were thirty-three bound nouns referring to external body parts compared to only five link nouns. This indicates that there are semantic differences between subclasses. For example, among the five link nouns is ao- ‘cheek’ is the only one that refers to external human body parts while others refer to external animal and insect parts (Osumi, 1995, p. 65). This shows that all external human body parts are bound nouns, except for ao- in Tîrî (Osumi, 1995, p. 65).

References
Osumi, M. (1995). Tinrin Grammar. Honolulu: University of Hawai'i Press.

Notes 

New Caledonian languages
Languages of New Caledonia
Definitely endangered languages